Fuchsia glazioviana, called Glaziou's fuchsia, is a species of flowering plant in the genus Fuchsia, native to southeast Brazil. It has gained the Royal Horticultural Society's Award of Garden Merit.

Uses
The small, dark, oblong fruit is edible and has a mild, sweet flavor.

References

glazioviana
Endemic flora of Brazil
Plants described in 1892